Przysieka  is a village in the administrative district of Gmina Zwierzyn, within Strzelce-Drezdenko County, Lubusz Voivodeship, in western Poland.

The village has a population of 240.

References

Przysieka